The Grabaei (also Kambaioi) were a minor Illyrian tribe who lived near Lake Skadar. They were mentioned by Pliny the Elder (23–79 AD).

History 

After Philip II of Macedon defeated Bardylis (358 BC), the Grabaei, under Grabos II, became the most powerful tribe in Illyria. 7,000 Illyrians were killed by Philip II's army in a great victory, annexing the territory up to Lake Ohrid. He then reduced the Grabaei, targeted another Illyrian king called Pleuratus (considered by some modern scholars an Ardiaean or Taulantian chieftain), defeated the Triballi (339 BC), and fought with Pleurias, king of the Autariatai (337 BC).

After 9 AD, the remnants of Illyrian tribes moved to new coastal cities and larger and more capable civitates; the Grabaei (called Kambaioi) were among these, mentioned by Pliny the Elder.

Kretschmer etymologically connected their name to Slavic grabǔ, "hornbeam", with a cognate in Epirote Greek gábros (γάβρος, "oak-wood"). Their name has been connected to Umbrian Krapuvi and Grabovie, gods of Iguvium. Gabraeum (Gabraion), a place in Epirus, may be connected to the tribe. The name of Illyrian king Grabos II suggests a connection with the tribe.

See also 
List of ancient Illyrian peoples and tribes

Notes

References

Bibliography 

Illyrian tribes
Illyrian Albania
Ancient tribes in Albania